Dean Brown (born 1943) is an Australian politician, Premier of South Australia 1993–1996.

Dean Brown may also refer to:

 Dean Brown (guitarist) (born 1955), American jazz fusion guitarist and session musician
 Dean Brown (sportscaster) (born 1961), Canadian hockey commentator
 H. Dean Brown (1927–2003), American scientist
 Dean Brown (American football) (born 1945), American football defensive back